The Man Who Lived Twice is a 1936 American crime film directed by Harry Lachman and starring Ralph Bellamy, Marian Marsh and Thurston Hall. It was remade as Man in the Dark in 1953.

Cast

References

Bibliography
 Cardullo, Bert. European Directors and Their Films: Essays on Cinema. Scarecrow Press, 2012.

External links

1936 films
American crime films
1936 crime films
Films directed by Harry Lachman
Columbia Pictures films
American black-and-white films
1930s English-language films
1930s American films